An artistic project curated by Ahmed Foula in Cairo, 2008.

Idea

Far from the consumptive aspect, which is closely connected to the nature of the field of graphic design as one of the applied arts, this project is based on exploring new design approaches that depends on the coincidence in its construction. The project relies on the idea of the Exquisite Corpse game, which was founded in 1925. The rules of the game were used to generate a succession of designs, as each participant will use the endpoint created by the previous designer to start his contribution. Each design consists of four consecutive contributions.

Six Graphic designers participated in *Breaking Boredom Project to create twelve designs according to particular rules that differ from the traditional thinking patterns. The First Exhibition of the pieces took place at The Townhouse Gallery, downtown Cairo. The Second exhibition took place at the Alexandria Contemporary Arts Forum (ACAF).

Participants

Ibrahim Eslam; born in Cairo in January 1977, graduated from the Faculty of Fine Arts in 2000.

Engy Aly; born in 1982. Studied Graphic Design and graduated in 2005. Exhibited artworks in different locations in Egypt and other countries. Currently a member of the FC Studio team, besides being a freelance graphic designer.

George Azmy; born in Cairo in 1983, graduated from fine arts faculty, Helwan University in 2005. Worked as a graphic designer, story border, illustrator, and compositing as a free lancer during college, then he worked in FC studio after graduation, after that he worked for a major advertising agency in Cairo, later he moved to Dubai, then back to Cairo to be a freelancer there. In 2007 he held his first solo exhibition, entitled "planet Cairo" at the Townhouse Gallery in Cairo.

Mofa; had one solo exhibition at the Townhouse Onsite titled "Everyday Heroes". He participated in a group workshop video screening at Rawabet Theatre, as well as a group workshop exhibition at the Goethe Institute in Cairo. He has also created designs for companies, retail, and publications through his studio Ganzeer.

Mahmoud Hamdy; born in 1977, Mahmoud Hamdy studied animation at the College of Fine Arts in Cairo. He has participated in a number of workshops and exhibitions. Through its Artists-in-Residence program, Pro Helvetia Cairo invited him at the F+F School for Media Art and Design, Zürich, Switzerland 2005–2006. His work participated, nominated and has been awarded in a number of International festivals and exhibitions. Since 2000, he collaborated with artists from Germany, Switzerland, as well as Egypt. He is one of the founding partners of [FC Studio] http://www.fileclub.org . Hamdy works with Video, Image, graphics and site-specific installation. He lives and works in Cairo.

Hani Mahfouz; graduated from the faculty of Fine Arts in Alexandria in 1988. In 1997, he founded h|m|d studio. Hani lives and works in Cairo.

Ahmed Foula (Curator of the project); graduated from the Architecture department of the Faculty of Fine Arts, Alexandria University in 2001. He started his career as a graphic designer with the publicity campaign of "Roaming Inner Landscapes" event, which was held in Alexandria in February 2003. Since then; he designed several campaigns for many artistic events in Egypt and in the Arab region, as well as visual identities for a number of culture and art spaces. Foula currently lives and works in Cairo as a freelance graphic designer.

References and external links
Breaking Boredom Project official website
FC Studio
Mahmoud Hamdy
The Townhouse Gallery
Ibrahim Eslam Website
George Azmy Page
Ganzeer Studio
hmd studio
Seashell Noise
Alexandria Contemporary Arts Forum
OTV coverage of Exhibition inauguration in Cairo (Arabic)

Graphic design
Egyptian culture